"Why Worry?" is a single by Irish group Clannad. It was released in 1991 and was the second single from their 1990 album Anam.

Track listing
7" vinyl, 12" vinyl, cassette & 5" compact disc
 "In Fortune's Hand"
 "Gaoth Bearra" (Live from the Royal Albert Hall)

External links
 Lyrics

Clannad songs
1991 singles
1990 songs
RCA Records singles
Songs written by Ciarán Brennan